Denis Sergeyevich Biryukov (born ) is a Russian male volleyball player. He is part of the Russia men's national volleyball team at the 2010 FIVB Volleyball Men's World Championship. On club level he plays for Dinamo-LO.

Sporting achievements

CEV Cup
  2014/2015, with Dinamo Moscow

References

External links
 profile at FIVB.org
 profile  at vcdynamo.ru

1988 births
Living people
Russian men's volleyball players
Universiade medalists in volleyball
Universiade gold medalists for Russia
Medalists at the 2009 Summer Universiade
Medalists at the 2013 Summer Universiade
Sportspeople from Volgograd
20th-century Russian people
21st-century Russian people